Journal of Intellectual Property Law is a biannual student-edited law review covering intellectual property law published by the University of Georgia School of Law. The journal covers trademarks, patents, copyright law, trade secrets, internet law, and sports and entertainment law.

Overview 
The journal was established in 1993 to respond to what the United States Circuit Court of Appeals judge Stanley F. Birch, Jr. described as "[t]he need for greater exposition on the law of intellectual property." In 2010, the Supreme Court of the United States cited the journal in Justice John Paul Stevens' concurring opinion in Bilski v. Kappos. In 2015, Washington and Lee University's Law Journal Rankings placed the journal among the top twenty five intellectual property law journals with the highest impact factor, and among the top ten most cited by cases.

Abstracting and indexing 
The journal is abstracted or indexed in:

 EBSCO databases, 
 HeinOnline
 LexisNexis
 Westlaw, and 
 The University of Washington's Current Index to Legal Periodicals.

See also 
 List of law journals
 List of intellectual property law journals

References

External links 
 

Intellectual property law journals
Biannual journals
Publications established in 1993
University of Georgia
English-language journals